Gatch is a surname. People with that name include:

 Lee Gatch (1902-1968), American artist
 Philip Gatch (1751-1835), American Methodist minister
 Thomas Gatch (disambiguation), several people

See also
 Gatch bed, a type of hospital bed invented by Willis Dew Gatch
 Gatch Site, an archaeological site located near Milford, Ohio, United States
 USS Hooper (DE-1026), originally USS Gatch